Xylodiscula is a genus of sea snails, marine gastropod molluscs in the family Xylodisculidae.

Species
According to the World Register of Marine Species, the following species are included in the genus Xylodiscula
 Xylodiscula analoga Warén & Bouchet, 2001
 Xylodiscula boucheti Warén, Carrozza & Rocchini in Warén, 1992
 Xylodiscula eximia B. A. Marshall, 1988
 Xylodiscula lens Warén, 1992
 Xylodiscula librata B. A. Marshall, 1988
 Xylodiscula major Warén & Bouchet, 1993
 Xylodiscula osteophila B. A. Marshall, 1994
 Xylodiscula planata Høisæter & Johanessen, 2001
 Xylodiscula vitrea B.A. Marshall, 1988
 Xylodiscula wareni Bogi & Bartolini, 2008

References

 Gofas, S.; Le Renard, J.; Bouchet, P. (2001). Mollusca, in: Costello, M.J. et al. (Ed.) (2001). European register of marine species: a check-list of the marine species in Europe and a bibliography of guides to their identification. Collection Patrimoines Naturels, 50: pp. 180–213
 Spencer, H.; Marshall. B. (2009). All Mollusca except Opisthobranchia. In: Gordon, D. (Ed.) (2009). New Zealand Inventory of Biodiversity. Volume One: Kingdom Animalia. 584 pp

Xylodisculidae